The M4-WAC-47 is a Ukrainian-made assault rifle created by Ukroboronprom and American company Aeroscraft (a division of Worldwide Aeros Corporation). It was tested within different sections of the Ukrainian Ground Forces and Border Guard, with testing estimated to have been completed in late April, 2018.

References

Rifles of Ukraine
Assault rifles
Rifles of the United States